Tiedong may refer to:

Tiedong District, Anshan, in Liaoning, China
Tiedong District, Siping, in Jilin, China